John Arthur Lewis (called John; born 4 October 1934) was  Archdeacon of Cheltenham from 1988 to 1998. 
 
Lewis was educated at Jesus College, Oxford and ordained after a period of study at Ripon College Cuddesdon in 1960. After  curacies in Prestbury and Wimborne Minster he held incumbencies in Nailsworth and Cirencester until his Archdeacon’s appointment.

References

1934 births
Alumni of Jesus College, Oxford
Alumni of Ripon College Cuddesdon
Archdeacons of Cheltenham
Living people